KF Milano Kumanovë is a football club based in Kumanovo, North Macedonia. They are currently competing in the OFS Kumanovo league.

History
The club was founded in 1990. They were promoted to the Macedonian First League in 2007 and were runners-up in the first two seasons. In 2010, the club finished ninth and lost a relegation play-off against Bregalnica Štip to relegate them to the Macedonian Second League, but due to financial problems Milano was relegated to the Macedonian Third League.

Season-by-season record
A season-by-season record of FK Milano Kumanovo league performances:

Honours
 Macedonian First League:
Runners-up: 2007–08, 2008–09
 Macedonian Football Cup:
Runners-up: 2007–08
 Macedonian Second League:
Winners (1): 2006–07

Milano in Europe
 Q = qualifier

Historical list of coaches

 Blagoja Kitanovski (2006)
 Bylbyl Sokoli (2007)
 Gjore Jovanovski (10 Oct 2007 – Jun 2008)
 Bylbyl Sokoli (1 Jul 2008 – 10 Jan 2009)
 Erkan Jusuf (1 Feb 2009 – Aug 2009)
 Džemail Zekiri (1 Sep 2009 – 28 Sep 2009)
 Kemal Ameti (29 Sep 2009 – Dec 2009)
 Dragan Antić (10 Jan 2010 – Jun 2010)

References

External links
Club info at MacedonianFootball 
Football Federation of Macedonia 

 
Milano
Association football clubs established in 1990
1990 establishments in the Socialist Republic of Macedonia
Milano